Chebfun is a free/open-source software system written in MATLAB for numerical computation with functions of a real variable.  It is based on the idea of overloading MATLAB's commands for vectors and matrices to analogous commands for functions and operators.  Thus, for example, whereas the SUM command in MATLAB adds up the elements of a vector, the SUM command in Chebfun evaluates a definite integral.  Similarly the backslash command in MATLAB becomes a Chebfun command for solving differential equations.

The mathematical basis of Chebfun is numerical algorithms involving piecewise polynomial interpolants and Chebyshev polynomials, and this is where the name "Cheb" comes from.  The package aims to combine the feel of symbolic computing systems like Maple and Mathematica with the speed of floating-point numerics.

The Chebfun project is based in the Mathematical Institute at the University of Oxford and was initiated in 2002 by Lloyd N. Trefethen and his student Zachary Battles.  The most recent version, Version 5.7.0, was released on June 2, 2017.

Chebfun2, a software system that extends Chebfun to two dimensions, was made publicly available on the 4th of March 2013. Following Chebfun2, Spherefun (extension to the unit sphere) and Chebfun3 (extension to three dimensions) were made publicly available in May and July 2016.

Features

 Approximation of functions in 1D, including functions with jumps
 Approximation of smooth bivariate functions (Chebfun2)
 Approximation of smooth trivariate functions (Chebfun3)
 Approximation of smooth functions on the unit sphere (Spherefun)
 Quadrature
 Rootfinding
 1D global optimisation
 Bivariate and trivariate rootfinding
 Ordinary differential equations
 Partial differential equations
 Vector calculus

Example usage

A user may begin by initialising the variable x, on the interval [0,10], say.

>> x = chebfun('x',[0,10]); 

This variable can now be used to perform further computations, for example, computing and plotting roots of a function:

>> f = sin(x) + sin(x.^2);  plot(f)
>> r = roots(f); hold on, plot(r,f(r),'.r'), hold off 

The definite integral can be computed with:

>> sum(f) 
ans 
   = 2.422742429006079

References

External links 
 
 Related projects and partial replacements in other languages: 

Mathematical software